¡Americano! is a musical telling based on the real-life story of Antonio (Tony) Valdovinos, a resident of the United States who learns that he is not a U.S. citizen when he tries to enlist in the U.S. Marine Corps. The script was written by Michael Barnard, Jonathan Rosenberg, and Fernanda Santos; Carrie Rodriguez composed the music. Barnard, Rosenberg, Santos and Rodriguez are credited together as lyricists.

Synopsis 
Inspired by the September 11 attacks when he was in sixth grade, and not wanting to pursue his father's career in construction, Tony goes to a Marine enlistment office on his 18th birthday. He is surprised to learn that he is an undocumented immigrant, and is upset with his parents for not telling him. Tony's friend Joaquin invites him to a meeting about the Deferred Action for Childhood Arrivals program that offers the possibility of legal work for those like him who were brought to the United States as children. He becomes a political activist to find a way to serve.

Development 
The play began development in 2015, when a public radio story about Valdovinos came to the attention of theatre producer Jason Rose and the Phoenix Theatre's long-time artistic director, Michael Barnard. The Off-Broadway performance was produced by Jason Roses' company, Quixote Productions in association with  Chicanos Por La Causa, a social advocacy organization that fights discrimination against Mexican-Americans.

Valdovinos's status as someone brought to the United States as a child without documentation makes him a "Dreamer", a reference to the DREAM Act, a legislative proposal to create a right to work and path to citizenship for those brought to the United States as children. Speaking about the play, the real-life Valdovinos told the New York Times, “Dreamers have lost hope and live with fear. Part of the message here is don’t lose the courage — continue holding on to hope. Nothing comes easy. Elections matter. Policies matter. People matter. ‘¡Americano!’ is about that.”

Productions 
The play's world premiere was on at the Phoenix Theatre Company on January 29, 2020. It had its Off-Broadway debut at New World Stages on May 1, 2022 where it was scheduled as a limited run. It closed June 19, 2022. Both productions were directed by Michael Bernard and starred Sean Ewing as Tony; Sergio Mejia was the choreographer for both productions.

Reception 
Reviews of both productions note the strength of the singing and choreography, and Rodriguez's Tejano- and indie-rock-inspired score. Writing for Theatre Mania, reviewer Zachary Stewart writes that it is an "unapologetically sincere flag-waving American musical — and that feels like a breath of fresh air in an age of snark and cynicism." The New York Times's Jose Solís called it "a story as urgent as it is entertaining."

References

External links 
 
 
 

2020 musicals
Biographical musicals
Off-Broadway musicals
Plays set in the 21st century
Plays set in the United States